The Gen. Thomas Hart House near Winchester, Kentucky, in Clark County, was built by 1808. It was a work of a John Hill. It was listed on the National Register of Historic Places in 1979.

The house has a hipped roof and has Federal details including a fanlight. A Clark County historic resources study asserts that the house's "careful Flemish bond brickwork with gauged jackarches is unsurpassed in Clark County."

See also
John Y. Hill, a builder in Kentucky

References

Houses on the National Register of Historic Places in Kentucky
Houses completed in 1808
Houses in Clark County, Kentucky
National Register of Historic Places in Clark County, Kentucky
1808 establishments in Kentucky
Federal architecture in Kentucky